Ensom Majestaet (meaning "Solitary Majesty" in Danish) is the highest mountain in Odinland, SE Greenland.

Geography
This mountain is a nunatak that rises roughly in the middle of the peninsula, east of the westward-flowing Sleipner Glacier and a little west of the Gungnir Ice Cap.

See also
List of mountains in Greenland
List of nunataks

References

External links
Not so green - Odin Land
Nunataks of Greenland
Ensom
Odinland